Claire Cashmore,  (born 21 May 1988) is a Paralympic Swimming Champion and PTS5 classified British paratriathlete. She has been to four Paralympic Games with swimming and has won 4 bronze, 3 silver, and 1 gold medal. Cashmore also broke the world record in the SM9 100m Individual Medley in 2009. She decided to switch to competing in paratriathlon after winning gold and silver at the Paralympic Games in 2016, and became ITU World Champion in the PTS5 classification in 2019. Claire Cashmore is based in Loughborough, England. She was born in Redditch, England, without a left forearm.

Career 
Cashmore made her debut for ParalympicsGB as a 16-year-old competing at Athens in 2004, winning two bronze medals. She won her first international medal in the 100m breaststroke SB8 at the 2006 IPC Swimming World Championships in Durban. During the 2009 season, Cashmore broke the European 200m IM record and represented GB at the World Short-Course Championships in Rio. Cashmore went on to win a bronze at the Paralympic Games in Beijing in 2008, and a further two silvers and a bronze at the Paralympic Games in London 2012. In 2014, she claimed her first individual gold medal on the international stage, marking her third IPC Swimming European Championships with a gold medal in the 100m breaststroke SB8. At the Paralympic Games in Rio de Janeiro in 2016 Claire took silver in the 100m breaststroke SB8 and also claimed a gold medal in the  medley relay.

After competing in Rio, Cashmore took some time to reflect on her career and decided to transition into Paratriathlon. She was given a place on the UK Sport talent transfer programme and made her major international debut at the 2017 ITU World Triathlon Grand Final Rotterdam. The 2018 season saw Cashmore win gold in the GBR Paratriathlon National Championships and four consecutive silver medals at the Eton Dorney ITU Paratriathlon World Cup, Iseo - Franciacorta ITU World Paratriathlon Series, Tartu ETU Triathlon European Championships and ITU World Triathlon Grand Final Gold Coast.

She enjoyed a number of successes in 2019 winning silver medals in the PTS5 classification at the Yokohama ITU World Paratriathlon Series, the Tokyo ITU Paratriathlon World Cup and the Valencia ETU Paratriathlon European Championships. However, her greatest achievements of the year saw her win gold at the GBR Paratriathlon National Championships, the Groupe Copley World Paratriathlon Series Montreal and the ITU World Triathlon Grand Final in Lausanne where she became ITU World Champion in the PTS5 classification.

Before the 2020 Summer Paralympics, Cashmore was tipped as a favourite for the Paratriathlon. She ultimately won bronze, with compatriot Lauren Steadman taking the gold.

Personal life
Cashmore was born on 21 May 1988 in Redditch, England, without a left forearm. She attended Dubai English Speaking School from 1994 and Hagley Catholic High School in Hagley, Worcestershire. Cashmore graduated from the University of Leeds in 2011 with a bachelor's degree in linguistics and phonetics.

Cashmore was appointed Member of the Order of the British Empire (MBE) in the 2017 New Year Honours for services to swimming.

Paratriathlon Competitions 
The following list of results. Unless indicated otherwise, the competitions are paratriathlons.

 DNF = Did not finish

 DNS = Did not start

 DSQ = Disqualified

References

English female swimmers
Paralympic swimmers of Great Britain
1988 births
Paralympic gold medalists for Great Britain
Paralympic silver medalists for Great Britain
Paralympic bronze medalists for Great Britain
Swimmers at the 2004 Summer Paralympics
Swimmers at the 2008 Summer Paralympics
Swimmers at the 2012 Summer Paralympics
Swimmers at the 2016 Summer Paralympics
Living people
Alumni of the University of Leeds
Medalists at the 2004 Summer Paralympics
Medalists at the 2008 Summer Paralympics
Medalists at the 2012 Summer Paralympics
Medalists at the 2016 Summer Paralympics
Medalists at the 2020 Summer Paralympics
S9-classified Paralympic swimmers
Members of the Order of the British Empire
Sportspeople from Redditch
British female triathletes
Paratriathletes of Great Britain
Medalists at the World Para Swimming Championships
Medalists at the World Para Swimming European Championships
Paralympic medalists in swimming
British female breaststroke swimmers
British female medley swimmers
British female backstroke swimmers